Maurice Galley (10 August 1934 – February 2017) is an English former footballer who scored 5 goals from 55 appearances in the Football League playing as a wing half for Chesterfield in the 1950s. He also played non-league football for teams including Boston United, Worksop Town, and Loughborough United, with whom he won the Midland League in 1962–63.

After his football career finished, Galley joined the police. He was a member of the Nottinghamshire Police football team that won the Police Athletic Association (PAA) Cup in 1969. Galley died in Nottinghamshire in February 2017 at the age of 82.

Galley's brothers Gordon and John Galley also played in the Football League.

References

1934 births
2017 deaths
People from Clowne
Footballers from Derbyshire
English footballers
Association football wing halves
Chesterfield F.C. players
Boston United F.C. players
Worksop Town F.C. players
Loughborough United F.C. players
English Football League players
Midland Football League players